Oppenheim Architecture is an architecture, planning, and interior practice based in Miami, New York, and Basel founded in 1999 by Chad Oppenheim. The firm has received multiple distinctions, including over 45 AIA Awards. Projects range between hospitality, commercial mixed-use, retail, and residential buildings in over 25 countries. The firm is notable for designing L.A. Villa, film director Michael Bay's residence. In 2018, the practice received the National Design Award for Interior Design by Cooper Hewitt, Smithsonian Design Museum.

History 
Oppenheim Architecture was established in 1999 by Chad Oppenheim. Oppenheim earned his B.Arch from Cornell University in 1994. Upon graduating, he worked at the Miami-based architecture and design firm Arquitectonica until 1999, when he departed to establish his own practice. Together with Beat Huesler, Chad Oppenheim opened the Basel office in 2009. Oppenheim Architecture New York opened in 2015.

Selected projects 
 2021 Escondido, Malibu
 2020 Star Metals Residences, Atlanta
 2018 Ayla Golf Clubhouse, Aqaba, Jordan
 2018 Emiliano Hotel, Rio de Janeiro
 2017 GLF Headquarters, Miami
 2016 Villa Allegra, Miami
 Chad Oppenheim's private residences
 2015 Net Metropolis, Manila
 First certified green building in the Philippines
 2015 AIA Miami Silver Award for Design
 2014 L.A.Villa, Los Angeles
 Michael Bay's private residences
 2013 House on a Dune, Bahamas
 2012 La Muna, Red Mountain, Aspen, Colorado
 2012 Kirchplatz Office, Basel, Switzerland
 2009 Simpson Park Hammock Pavilion, Miami
 2007 Ten Museum Park, Miami
 Ranks among the 20 tallest buildings in Miami

Selected awards 
 2018 National Design Award for Interior Design by Cooper Hewitt, Smithsonian Design Museum
 2016 AIA Florida/Caribbean, Honor Award of Excellence (L.A. Villa)
 2016 AIA Miami, Honor Award of Excellence (Bal Harbour House; South Beach Penthouse)
 2015 AIA Miami Merit Award of Excellence (L.A. Villa)
 2014 AIA Miami Design Awards (House on a Dune)
 2013 AIA Miami Firm of the Year
 2013 Chicago Athenaeum International Architecture Award (Wharf Road, Australia)
 2012 Design Center of the Americas Stars of Design Annual Award for Architecture
 2011 World Architecture Festival (Wadi Rum Desert Resort)
 2008 AIA Miami Design Awards (Ten Museum Park)
 2006 AIA Miami Design Awards (Park Avenue, Cube, COR)

Publications 
 Spirit of Place, published by Tra Publishing, 2018
LAIR: Radical Homes and Hideouts of Movie Villains, published by Tra Publishing, 2019

References

External links 
 Oppenheim Architecture website

Architecture firms based in Florida
Architecture in Florida
Architecture firms of the United States